Miss Tourism International is an annual international beauty pageant run and owned by Malaysia–based D’Touch International Sdn. Bhd. Foundation.

The current Miss Tourism International is Suphatra Kliangprom from Thailand. She was crowned on November 25, 2022.

History
The Miss Tourism International world final is a New Year’s Eve pageant that plays host to many international beauty queens from around the world. The pageant was first held in 1994 at Kuching, Sarawak, where 24 contestants competed. In 2011, the pageant was live telecast on RTM1 and witnessed by thousands of revellers at Dataran Merdeka prior to the 2012 countdown. 

The inauguration of Miss Tourism Queen International was held in Colombo, Sri Lanka in 2002. Also in 2002, the first live internet broadcast of the event occurred. In 2022, the pageant was hosted again in Kuching, Sarawak for the second time in 28 years. The pageant was held for 18 days from 11 to 28 November.

Editions

Titleholders

Miss Tourism International by number of wins

Gallery of winners

Other titleholders

Miss Tourism Queen of the Year International 

       No contest Miss Tourism Queen of the Year International

Miss Tourism Queen of the Year International by number of wins

Miss Tourism Metropolitan International 

       No contest Miss Tourism Metropolitan International

Miss Tourism Metropolitan International by number of wins

Miss Tourism Global titleholders 

       No contest Miss Tourism Global

Miss Tourism Global by number of wins

Miss Tourism Cosmopolitan International 

       No contest Miss Tourism Cosmopolitan International

Miss Tourism Cosmopolitan International by number of wins

Subsidiary awards titleholders

Dreamgirl of the Year International 

       No contest Miss Dreamgirl of the Year International

Miss Dreamgirl of the Year International by number of wins

Miss South East Asia Tourism Ambassadress 

       No contest Miss South East Asia Tourism Ambassadress

Miss South East Asia Tourism Ambassadress by number of wins

Past title

Miss Intercontinental International 

       No contest Miss Intercontinental International

Miss Intercontinental International by number of wins

See also 
 List of beauty contests

References

Further reading

 The Observer
 Daily Monitor
 The Organization of Asia-Pacific News Agencies

External links
 

Beauty pageants in Malaysia
International beauty pageants
1994 establishments in Malaysia
Recurring events established in 1994